The 1952 Auburn Tigers football team represented Auburn University in the 1952 college football season. It was the Tigers' 61st overall and 20th season as a member of the Southeastern Conference (SEC). The team was led by head coach Ralph "Shug" Jordan, in his second year, and played their home games at Cliff Hare Stadium in Auburn, Legion Field in Birmingham and Ladd Memorial Stadium in Mobile, Alabama. They finished with a record of two wins and eight losses (2–8 overall, 0–7 in the SEC).

Schedule

Source: 1952 Auburn football schedule

References

Auburn
Auburn Tigers football seasons
Auburn Tigers football